The 2019–20 season was Al-Taawoun's 64th year in their history and 10th consecutive season in the Pro League. This season Al-Taawoun participated in the Pro League, the King Cup, the Saudi Super Cup, and the 2020 AFC Champions League.

The season covers the period from 1 July 2019 to 27 September 2020.

Players

Squad information

Out on loan

Transfers and loans

Transfers in

Loans in

Transfers out

Loans out

Competitions

Overview

Goalscorers

Last Updated: 24 September 2020

Assists

Last Updated: 24 September 2020

Clean sheets

Last Updated: 24 September 2020

References

Al-Taawoun FC seasons
Taawoun